Silvia Picozzi is an Italian physicist who researches density functional theory, ferroelectricity, and antiferromagnetism at the Consiglio Nazionale delle Ricerche. She is an elected fellow of the American Physical Society.

Early life and education
Silvia Picozzi received a bachelor's degree in physics from University of L'Aquila in 1994, and in 1998 she graduated with her PhD from the University of Camerino.

Career
Silvia Picozzi works at the Consiglio Nazionale delle Ricerche, the National Research Council of Italy. She works in the Physical Sciences and Technologies of Matter department, where she is the director of research of SPIN (Superconducting and other Innovative Materials and Devices Institute) in Chieti, Italy. She is also part of the Nanoscience Foundries & Fine Analysis international project located in Trieste.

Selected publications
Some of Picozzi's most-cited works as of 2021 include:

Awards and honors
Silvia Picozzi was elected as a fellow of the American Physical Society in 2019. Her APS fellowship was in recognition of her "pioneering contributions to the fundamental understanding of microscopic mechanisms linking magnetic and electric dipolar degrees of freedom, through advanced modelling of ferroelectrics, antiferromagnets and multi-ferroics".

References

Living people
21st-century Italian physicists
University of L'Aquila alumni
University of Camerino alumni
Fellows of the American Physical Society
Year of birth missing (living people)
National Research Council (Italy) people
Italian women physicists